The East Peak of Mount Osceola is one of the official New Hampshire 4000-footers, standing at an elevation of . It can be approached via the Greeley Ponds trail from the Kancamagus Highway or from the summit of neighboring Osceola. Both routes are not without difficulties; the trail from the ponds is extremely steep and prolonged, and the approach from Osceola contains a chimney, along with a less hazardous bypass by way of the saddle connecting the peaks. The summit is nondescript and surrounded by trees.

See also

List of mountains in New Hampshire

References

External links
 
 "Hiking Mount Osceola". Appalachian Mountain Club.

Mountains of Grafton County, New Hampshire
Mountains of New Hampshire
Osceola